The University of Central Florida Center for Emerging Media (CEM) is located in downtown Orlando.

The Center supports many upper-level undergraduate and graduate programs in film, digital media, video game development, art and architecture.

The facility also features one of the largest motion-capture studios on the East Coast, an adjacent sound stage, production offices and editing suites. Collectively known as Studio 500—a play on the building’s 500 W. Livingston St. location—these production facilities have attracted a steady stream of entertainment companies from around the world and annually host about 10-15 UCF student film shoots.

Departments
The Center for Emerging Media houses eight separate departments:

 Citi-Lab Orlando
 Center for Research in Education, Arts, Technology and Entertainment (CREATE)
 Florida Interactive Entertainment Academy (FIEA)
 Flying Horse Editions
 Studio 500
 UCF Film Department's MFA Production Wing
 Vicon House of Moves
 Visual Language

See also
University of Central Florida
Florida Interactive Entertainment Academy
University of Central Florida College of Arts and Humanities

References

External links
University of Central Florida
UCF Film Department
UCF Digital Media Department
Florida Interactive Entertainment Academy

Video game universities
University of Central Florida
Educational institutions established in 2008
2008 establishments in Florida